Semtenga is a village in the Siglé Department of Boulkiemdé Province in central western Burkina Faso. It has a population of 792.

References

Populated places in Boulkiemdé Province